It Can Be Done may refer to:
 It Can Be Done (1929 film), an American comedy film
 It Can Be Done (1921 film), an American silent comedy film

See also
 It Can Be Done Amigo, a 1972 Spanish / Italian / French film